Naorem Tondomba Singh (born 1 February 1999) is an Indian professional footballer who plays as a defensive midfielder for I-League club NEROCA, on loan from Mumbai City.

Career
Tondomba hails from Tentha, a small village in Thoubal district in Manipur. The midfielder started playing football at very early, like all other children from his state.

At youth level, Tondomba played for the Shillong Lajong Youth Academy and then the NEROCA FC U-18. He left for Manipur State League side KLASA before returning to the senior team of NEROCA.

On 27 October 2018, Tondomba made his professional debut in NEROCA home game against East Bengal. The midfielder played a pivotal role in NEROCA's 2018–19 I-League campaign. His creativity in the midfield, passing ability and wing-play suited to the style of their former coach Manuel Retamero Fraile.
 
On 17 May 2019, Tondomba joined East Bengal on a four-year deal.

NEROCA
In July 2022, Tondomba returned to I-League club NEROCA on loan from Indian Super League club Mumbai City. On 18 August, he made his return debut in the Imphal Derby against TRAU in the Durand Cup, which ended in a 3–1 win. He was awarded Player of the Match.

Career statistics

Club

References

Living people
1999 births
Indian footballers
NEROCA FC players
People from Thoubal district
Footballers from Manipur
I-League players
Association football midfielders
East Bengal Club players
Indian Super League players
Mumbai City FC players